Linguistics of the Tibeto-Burman Area is a biannual peer-reviewed academic journal covering research on the Sino-Tibetan languages and other mainland Southeast Asian languages. It was established in 1974 and was closely associated with the Sino-Tibetan Etymological Dictionary and Thesaurus project led by James A. Matisoff until the project's end in 2015. Starting from volume 37 (2014), it has been published by John Benjamins Publishing Company. The journal is abstracted and indexed in Scopus.

See also
Journal of the Southeast Asian Linguistics Society
Oceanic Linguistics

References

External links

Volumes 1-29 (open access)

Biannual journals
Publications established in 1974
English-language journals
Historical linguistics journals
Sino-Tibetan languages
Languages of Southeast Asia
John Benjamins academic journals
James Matisoff